The 1925 Middle Tennessee Teachers football team represented Middle Tennessee State Teachers College—now known as Middle Tennessee State University—during the 1925 college football season. Led by Guy Stephenson in his second and final season as head coach, Middle Tennessee Teachers compiled a record of 3–4–2. The team's captain was Keathly Presgrove.

Schedule

References

Middle Tennessee State Teachers
Middle Tennessee Blue Raiders football seasons
Middle Tennessee State Teachers football